Alpena may refer to:

Places in the United States

Michigan
Alpena, Michigan, the sole city in, and the county seat of Alpena County
Alpena County, Michigan, a county in the state of Michigan
Alpena County Regional Airport, county-owned public-use airport
Alpena Township, Michigan, a township located in Alpena County, surrounding the city

Other states
Alpena, Arkansas, a town located in Boone County, Arkansas
Alpena, South Dakota, a town located in Jerauld County, South Dakota
Alpena, West Virginia, an unincorporated community in Randolph County, West Virginia

Education
Alpena Community College, Alpena, Michigan
Alpena Public Schools, a school district in Alpena and Presque Isle Counties, Michigan
Alpena High School (Michigan), the district high school

Other uses
SS Alpena, a steamer which sank in Lake Michigan in 1880
Alpena (automobile), an American car manufactured from 1910 to 1914

See also
 Alpen (disambiguation)

Disambiguation pages
Henry Schoolcraft neologisms